Zach Stone Is Gonna Be Famous is an American mockumentary sitcom created by Bo Burnham and Dan Lagana that aired for one season on MTV from May 2 to June 29, 2013. The series stars Burnham as Zach Stone, a recent high school graduate who opts to pursue a life of fame instead of attending college, subsequently hiring a camera crew to film his daily life as a "pre-celebrity" in his quest to become famous overnight despite being essentially talentless.

Three days before the first season finished, it was announced that the show had been cancelled. In 2021, the series suddenly received renewed interest following a massive surge in Burnham's popularity in the months after the release of his critically acclaimed one-man Netflix special Inside, and was soon made available to stream on Netflix.

Premise
18-year-old Boston native Zach Stone graduates from high school and decides to chase a life of fame instead of attending college. Having saved money from his grocery store job over the last couple of years, he hires a camera crew from MTV to film him throughout his daily life as a part of his quest to become an overnight celebrity, even though he possesses no real talent. He tries anything possible to get noticed—such as trying to become a celebrity chef, creating novelty ringtones, and intentionally going missing—and will stop at nothing until he reaches stardom. He uses the entire summer break to get noticed and to hang out with his friends and love interest before they leave for college.

Background
The series was commissioned by MTV in September 2010. Variety magazine reported that MTV had ordered a half-hour-long put pilot from Burnham about "a kid fresh out of high school who's pursuing the new American dream of being a celebrity without having any talent". The show was inspired by a study that asked graduating high schoolers about the careers they wanted, with 40% choosing simply "famous" compared to shockingly low numbers choosing careers such as "doctor". The pilot was filmed in 2011, while the rest of the season was filmed over the course of 2012.

Burnham initially planned the show to be a dark satire that would punish Zach for having shallow priorities, but he soon saw Zach as a sympathetic character due to being an inevitable result of the culture surrounding him. The show spoofs youth culture, celebrity, and the pursuit of fame. Zach projects the public image that he believes will most likely make him famous and casts a thin layer over his true feelings, but the mask often slips to reveal that he is an insecure young man who sees fame as the solution to all of his problems. The show was primarily inspired by comedy series such as The Larry Sanders Show, The Comeback, and the original British version of The Office, the latter of which Burnham considers one of his favorite shows of all time, stating that he watches it from start to finish at least once a year.

Cast
Bo Burnham as Zach Stone, a recently graduated 18-year-old who pursues fame over attending college and will do anything to get famous
Tom Wilson as Andrew "Drew" Stone, Zach's exasperated father
Kari Coleman as Sydney Stone, Zach's patient mother
Cameron Palatas as Andrew Michael "Andy" Stone, Zach's more athletic and socially adept younger brother
Caitlin Gerard as Amy Page, Zach's friend, neighbor, and eventual love interest
Armen Weitzman as Greg LeBlanc, Zach's shy Jewish friend
Rory Scovel as Pat, Zach's nervous yet affable boss at the grocery store
Robbie Amell as Nick, Amy's charismatic boyfriend who works as a personal trainer, and whom Zach sees as his rival
Shelley Hennig as Christy Ackerman, the hottest girl in Zach's former high school who wants to use him to get famous
Jason Rogel as Marcus, a member of Zach's camera crew
Justin Dray as Phillip, a member of Zach's camera crew
Arshad Aslam as Hasaad, a member of Zach's camera crew

Episodes

Reception

Ratings
Zach Stone Is Gonna Be Famous struggled in the ratings during its run. The series premiered to 650,000 viewers and saw its numbers decrease to half of that midway through its season. The show originally aired at 10:30 p.m. on Thursdays during May, but was moved to 11 p.m. in June to expand its dwindling audience. MTV scheduled its eighth and ninth episodes to air back to back, and burned off the following three the next week. MTV officially cancelled the series on June 26.

Critical response
Zach Stone Is Gonna Be Famous received generally positive reviews from television critics. Brian Lowry of Variety wrote that "the concept is hardly original" but the series "still feels fresh and timely [...] this single-camera satire zeroes in on a burning, warped desire to be famous that MTV, as much as anyone, has stoked and exemplified". He added that "even MTV appears oddly oblivious to the ironies of this dichotomy". Entertainment Weekly called the pilot a "promising debut", positively reviewing Burnham's portrayal of the titular character: "Because there's an inherent empathy to the character, it's a delight watching him strive and fail to make the mundane ordinariness of his suburban reality sexy." While noting the premise of parodying reality shows covered no new ground, The New York Times did commend the show's attempt to aim "straight for the dark underbelly of all these fantasies" and wrote, "It's one thing to put on a show; it's another to do so to mask huge holes within."

Pilot Viruet of The A.V. Club noted that the character's "off-camera moments", such as his appeasement of girl-next-door Amy in the pilot, were more satisfying than watching "a completely abhorrent character do awful thing after awful thing". Viruet added, "It's clear that the writers (and Zach) are so knowledgeable of this particular world that the end result is smarter than you'd expect the average reality show send-up to be." Newsday called the show "almost too clever, funny and ironic for MTV", also praising the show's softer moments: "Zach is both commentary and send-up of the ephemera that MTV and the Internet at large celebrate – then instantly forget. [...] But there's a core gentleness here, too, and while Zach's frenetic attention span is extremely splintered, he still manages to be relatable."

In contrast, David Wiegand of the San Francisco Chronicle felt that the show "is more noisy than funny" and compared it to Burnham's beginnings posting videos to YouTube from his bedroom: "His bedroom videos were weird, too, but funny-weird, not I-need-an-Excedrin weird." Hank Stuever of The Washington Post gave the series a scathing review, claiming that "this show is so bad, it's beneath even MTV". Describing the series as "irritating", he said, "One thing about MTV's so-called original programming is that it is often a safe refuge for the criminally unoriginal. I would like to point out that we can extradite Burnham back to reality and prosecute him as an adult."

References

External links

2013 American television series debuts
2013 American television series endings
2010s American mockumentary television series
2010s American teen sitcoms
English-language television shows
MTV original programming
Television series about teenagers
Television series by 3 Arts Entertainment
Works by Bo Burnham